Brickellia vernicosa   is a Mexican species of flowering plants in the family Asteraceae. It is native to north-central Mexico, in the states of Durango, Zacatecas, and Chihuahua.

Brickellia vernicosa  is a shrub with striped bark and violet flower heads.

References

External links
Photo of herbarium specimen at Missouri Botanical Garden, collected in Durango, isotype of Brickellia vernicosa 

vernicosa
Flora of Durango
Flora of Zacatecas
Chihuahua
Plants described in 1901